Geoff Hocking (born 10 March 1959) is a former Australian rules footballer who played with Carlton in the Victorian Football League (VFL). He later played for Claremont in the West Australian Football League (WAFL) and Box Hill in the Victorian Football Association (VFA). He coached Traralgon in the 1997 VFL season.

Notes

External links 

Geoff Hocking's profile at Blueseum

1959 births
Carlton Football Club players
Living people
Australian rules footballers from Victoria (Australia)
Claremont Football Club players
Box Hill Football Club players
Traralgon Football Club coaches